Josephine Angelini (born 1975) is an American author who is best known for her Young adult fiction novel trilogy Starcrossed.

Biography 
Angelini was born and raised in Ashland, Massachusetts. She is the daughter of a farmer and the youngest of eight siblings. She graduated from New York University's Tisch School of the Arts, and then moved to Los Angeles. She lives there with her husband and daughter.

Work

Starcrossed Trilogy 

 Starcrossed (2011), HarperCollins. . 
 Dreamless (2012), HarperCollins. . 
 Goddess (2013), HarperCollins. .

The Worldwalker Series 

 Trial by Fire (2014), Macmillan Publishers. .
 Firewalker (2015), Macmillan Publishers. .
Rowan (2015), Macmillan Publishers. .
 Witch's Pyre (2016), Macmillan Publishers. .

Standalone novels 

 Snow Lane (2018), Feiwel & Friends. .
 What She Found in the Woods (2019), Macmillan Children's Books. .

References 


1975 births
Living people
American women novelists
Writers from Massachusetts
People from Ashland, Massachusetts
21st-century American novelists
21st-century American women writers
American fantasy writers
American writers of young adult literature